Phragmataecia pelostema is a species of moth of the family Cossidae. It is found in Togo, Cameroon and Nigeria. It was described by German entomologist Erich Martin Hering in 1923.

References

Moths described in 1923
Phragmataecia
Moths of Africa